Charles Albert Deal (October 30, 1891 – September 16, 1979), was a professional baseball player who played third base in the Major Leagues from 1912 to 1921. He would play for the Chicago Cubs, Boston Braves, St. Louis Browns, St. Louis Terriers, and Detroit Tigers.

In 1914, Deal was a member of the Braves team that went from last place to first place in two months, becoming the first team to win a pennant after being in last place on the Fourth of July. The team then went on to defeat Connie Mack's heavily favored Philadelphia Athletics in the 1914 World Series. When his request for a salary increase for 1915 was rejected, Deal jumped to the Federal League, playing for the St. Louis Terriers. Deal only played 65 games for the Terriers, due to being hospitalised with a bout of typhoid fever.

In 1917 Deal led the National League in sacrifice hits with 29. He also proved to be very reliable defensively, leading National League third baseman in fielding three years in a row (1919–1921). Deal then played for several teams in the Pacific Coast League in the mid-1920s, before ending his career at Chattanooga in the Southern Association in 1927.

He was the last surviving member of the 1914 World Champion Boston Braves.

References

External links

1891 births
1979 deaths
Major League Baseball third basemen
Baseball players from Pennsylvania
Chicago Cubs players
St. Louis Browns players
St. Louis Terriers players
Detroit Tigers players
Boston Braves players
Providence Grays (minor league) players
Los Angeles Angels (minor league) players
Vernon Tigers players
Portland Beavers players
New Orleans Pelicans (baseball) players
People from Wilkinsburg, Pennsylvania